Carolyn Nelson is the name of:

 Carolyn Nelson (politician) (born 1937), member of the North Dakota Senate
 Carolyn Nelson Sargent, actress active during the 1960s and 1970s, wife of Joseph Sargent